Handful of Hate is an Italian black metal band active since 1993. They released seven studio albums, Qliphothic Supremacy, Hierarchy 1999, Vicecrown, Gruesome Splendour, You Will bleed, To Perdition and Adversus.

Biography
Handful of Hate was originally started in the year 1993. In the beginning there were many line-up difficulties, but in 1995 they released their first demo, entitled Goetia Summa. They played several live shows in northern Italy before they were signed to a record label in 1996. They released the album Qliphothic Supremacy, and proceeded to tour in Italy again. 
In 1999 the band released the album Hierarchy 1999. Many stylistic changes were made, making the music faster and more brutal. Lyrically the album dealt with sexual, fetish, and carnal concepts. This album drew a lot of attention to the band, and after the tour, they were signed to the Swedish label, Downfall Records. A 7-inch entitled Death from Above was released in 2001. They also cut a deal with Code7 Management in October 2002. The Production of the Death from Above is much cleaner than their previous recordings. Code666 Records put out a double compilation entitled Better Undead Than Alive that included one track off of Death from Above in 2002.

October 2003 saw the release of the band's album Vicecrown. This album got the band even more recognition, and has included many new stylistic changes. in November of the same year, they released a 7-inch EP called Scorn and Conquest on Warlord Records. This album includes many unreleased songs and an Impaled Nazarene Cover. They also released an EP called Blood Calls Blood, that features two unreleased songs and the tracks "Death from Above" and "The World is Prey" from the Death from Above promo. They recently coined the term "Carnival Black Metal" to describe their music. In 2012, they released their  album To Perdition. They are known for their intense live activity all over Europe, often supported by other relevant members of the Italian black metal scene such as Veratrum.

Line-up
Nicola Bianchi - vocals, guitar
Andrea Toto - guitar
Luca Buti - bass
Aeternus - drums

Former members
Ugo Pandolfini - Bass
Adriano Di Ricco - Bass
Enrico Santi - Bass
Matteo Fantozzi - Bass
Damiano Michetti - Bass
Andrea Zannoni - Guitar
Luciano Zella - Guitar
Marco Mazzoni - Guitar
Claudio Alcara - Guitar
Geny - Guitar
J.M. - Drums
Gionata Potenti - Drums
Andrea Bianchi - Drums

Discography
Goetia Summa (demo), 1995
Qliphothic Supremacy (album), 1997
Hierarchy 1999 (album), 1999
"Death from Above" (single), 2001
Vicecrown (album), 2003
"Scorn and Conquest" (single), 2003
Blood Calls Blood (mini-album), 2004
Gruesome Splendour (album), 2006
You Will Bleed (album), 2009
To Perdition (album), 2012
Adversus (album), 2019

References

External links
 Handful of Hate Official Website
 Handful of Hate at Encyclopaedia Metallum

Italian black metal musical groups
Musical groups established in 1993
1993 establishments in Italy